Sir Thomas Anton Bertram KC (8 February 1869 – 17 September 1937) was an English Barrister and the 22nd Chief Justice of Ceylon. He was appointed on 26 July 1918 succeeding Alexander Wood Renton and was Chief Justice until 1925. He was succeeded by Charles Ernest St. John Branch.

Life
Bertram was born in Barnstable, Devon, on 8 February 1869, the son of the Reverend R. A. Bertram, a Congregational minister. He was educated at Gonville and Caius College, Cambridge. He was called to the bar in 1893 and appointed Attorney-General of The Bahamas in July 1902. In 1907 he was appointed a Puisne Judge in Cyprus and then Attorney-General of Ceylon in 1911.

Bertam died at his home in Canterbury, Kent, on 17 September 1937, aged 68.

References

Chief Justices of British Ceylon
20th-century Sri Lankan people
19th-century Sri Lankan people
Sri Lankan people of British descent
19th-century British people
Attorneys General of British Ceylon
Alumni of Gonville and Caius College, Cambridge
1869 births
1937 deaths
People from Barnstaple